The Tiger (虎) is the third of the 12-year cycle of animals which appear in the Chinese zodiac related to the Chinese calendar. The Year of the Tiger is associated with the Earthly Branch symbol 寅.

Years and the Five Elements
People born within these date ranges can be said to have been born in the "Year of the Tiger", while bearing the following elemental sign:

Basic astrology elements

See also
Tiger
Burmese zodiac

References

External links

Chinese astrological signs
Vietnamese astrological signs
Tigers in popular culture
Mythological felines
de:Chinesische Astrologie#Zählung ab Jahresbeginn